Ha-yoon, also Ha-yun, is a Korean unisex given name. Its meaning depends on the hanja used to write each syllable of the name. There are 24 hanja with the reading "ha" and 16 hanja with the reading "yoon" on the South Korean government's official list of hanja which may be registered for use in given names. Ha-yoon was the fifth-most popular name for newborn girls in South Korea in 2015, with 2,356 being given the name, and rose to first place in the first nine months of 2017.

People with this name include:
Kim Ha-yoon, South Korean male skier, represented South Korea in Cross-country skiing at the 1960 Winter Olympics – Men's 30 km.
Song Ha-yoon (born Kim Mi-sun, 1986), South Korean actress
 (born 1992), South Korean female trot singer
Ji Ha-yoon (born Ji Yoon-mi, 1995), South Korean actress and model

See also
List of Korean given names

References

Korean unisex given names